OpenCaster is a collection of open-source and free software for the Debian GNU/Linux system to play out and multiplex MPEG transport streams. OpenCaster generates most of the non audio/video data present into transport streams and handle playout of pre-encoded audio/video files or can be integrated with third parties audio/video encoders.

Common use cases
 Table generator (PSI/SI and EPG)
 Interactive TV standards DSMCC object carousel broadcast (MHP, MHEG5, HbbTv, ...)
 Multiplexing of input multicast UDP MPEG transport stream to output multicast UDP transport stream
 Playout of locally stored, offline encoded audio and video for non-live TV and/or radio stations
 VOD system based on mpeg2 transport stream over IP or over DVB-* for walled garden network like hotels with coax
 DVB-SSU update for decoders OTA
 Teletext generator

Design principles
OpenCaster supports Interprocess communication among its different tools using Named pipes and enabling a high customization level by any user with basic shell script skills. The pipe paradigm has been criticized for performance 
, still the easy customization payoff is too valuable compared to the performance lost and doesn't present any issue in current  Mbps throughput.

Table generation is performed with serialization of a natural language description in Python and already features a large number of descriptors from  different digital television standards. Adding new descriptors at the library is really fast and doesn't need any particular programming skill beside knowing how the packet is specified bit by bit.

History
Originally tests were done in Cineca as a research project under a different name targeting broadcast of DSMCC file system for MHP interactive television but the project was already started from works by German National Research Center for Information Technology. The first service featuring OpenCaster DSMCC was broadcast on air in Italy in 2003. The first non-live DVB service 100% generated by OpenCaster and open source mpeg2 encoders is operating on air since 2004. OpenCaster was presented at the 16th ACM international conference on Multimedia    since then has been used also in other researches: DVB-T DIGITAL TV TANSMITTER BASED SOFTWARE
,  MHP Conformance test
,  Building of an HbbTV demonstrator
  a project in collaboration with European Broadcasting Union, Open Source End-2-End DVB-H Mobile TV services and network infrastructure — The DVB-H pilot in Denmark. OpenCaster was used in the HbbTV Test suite in 2014  and has been cited as tool in From the Aether to the Ethernet – Attacking the Internet using Broadcast Digital Television

Integration
OpenCaster has been successfully integrated with a long list of broadcasting products, among them there are products by Adtec, Cisco/Scientific Atlanta, Deltacast, Dektec, Ericsson/Tandberg Television, Eurotek, Harmonic/Scopus, MainConcept, Mitan, Screen Service, Sr-Systems, Wellav, ...

Testing
OpenCaster has been tested with Rohde & Schwarz DVM100L and DVM 400 and it is continuously tested with Dektec StreamXpert

References

Streaming software